Garcon Point may refer to:
Garcon Point (Florida), a peninsula in the U.S. state of Florida
Garcon Point, Florida, a community on the peninsula
Garcon Point Bridge, a bridge in Florida